Sunita Rani (born 4 December 1979) is an Indian athlete from Punjab who won a gold medal in the 1,500 m race and a bronze in the 5,000 m during the 2002 Asian Games. Her time of 4:06.03 in the 1,500 metres is the current Indian national record. She received the Arjuna award in 1999 and the Padma Shri in 2015 for her achievements. She later raised controversy when she was charged with doping. Her medals were revoked but subsequently reinstated after an investigation.

Life and career
Rani hails from Sunam, Punjab and is best known for her performance at the 2002 Asian Games, where she won a gold medal in the 1,500 m race and a bronze in the 5,000 m.

Controversy
Rani was hit with controversy about her performance at the 2002 Asian Games in Busan, South Korea, after she tested positive for nandrolone, a banned substance that aids recovery, strength, and endurance. Both her medals were revoked. The Indian Olympic Association fought to prove that the doping tests had major procedural irregularities and that the results were not valid. Rani has categorically maintained that she had not taken any banned substances. She had also cleared the dope test in Delhi, on the eve of the Indian team's departure to Busan.

The Olympic Council of Asia later officially admitted that there had been discrepancies in her drug test. On 3 January 2003, the International Association of Athletics Federations officially cleared Rani of doping charges and reinstated her medals. The Amateur Athletic Federation of India held a 'Restoration of Medals' ceremony on 4 February 2003, to officially return Rani's medals.

References

External links
 

Living people
Sportswomen from Punjab, India
Indian female long-distance runners
20th-century Indian women
20th-century Indian people
Indian female middle-distance runners
Indian police officers
Asian Games gold medalists for India
Asian Games silver medalists for India
Asian Games bronze medalists for India
Asian Games medalists in athletics (track and field)
Athletes (track and field) at the 1998 Asian Games
Athletes (track and field) at the 2002 Asian Games
World Athletics Championships athletes for India
Recipients of the Arjuna Award
Recipients of the Padma Shri in sports
1979 births
Indian women police officers
Place of birth missing (living people)
Medalists at the 1998 Asian Games
Medalists at the 2002 Asian Games